Reedham may refer to:

Reedham, Norfolk, a village in Norfolk
Reedham (Norfolk) railway station in Reedham, Norfolk
Reedham, London, a locality or neighbourhood of Purley, London
Reedham (Surrey) railway station in Purley, London